Maurie Beasy (14 March 1896 – 28 April 1979) was an Australian rules footballer who played with Carlton in the Victorian Football League (VFL).

Notes

External links 

Maurie Beasy's profile at Blueseum

1896 births
Australian rules footballers from Victoria (Australia)
Carlton Football Club players
1979 deaths